Margaret Marrs (née Lewin; born 1929) is an English computer programmer who was the Senior Operator of the original Electronic delay storage automatic computer (EDSAC). EDSAC was an early British computer constructed at the University of Cambridge Mathematical Laboratory in England, and the second electronic digital stored-program computer to go into regular service.

Education 
Born in Lancashire, Marrs grew up in a village called Simonstone. She attended the Clitheroe Royal Grammar School where she completed maths, Latin, and French as her Higher School Certificate subjects. She studied maths at the Girton College in Cambridge, graduating in 1948.

Career 
In 1951, Marrs worked as a computer programmer for Ferranti, a UK electrical engineering and equipment firm based in Manchester. Her work focused on adapting 39 differential equations for automatic computers. She accomplished this by working from a paper published in the late 1940s by Stanley Gill, adapting the Runge–Kutta method of solving differential equations for automatic computers.

In 1952, Marrs returned to Cambridge where she was employed by University of Cambridge Mathematical Laboratory as the Senior Operator for EDSAC. Her job included punching tape into the computer to run programs.

In 2016, Marrs and other former EDSAC computer scientists, including Joyce Wheeler and Liz Howe, assisted the National Museum of Computing's efforts to recreate the EDSAC by providing information on the EDSAC's machinery. Marrs and other EDSAC veterans visited the reconstruction team to celebrate the 70th anniversary of EDSAC.

References 

1929 births
Living people
People educated at Clitheroe Royal Grammar School
Alumni of Girton College, Cambridge
British women computer scientists
20th-century British women scientists